Zuqaq al-Blat is one of the twelve quarters of Beirut.

Etymology
Zoqaq al-Blat literally means "the cobbled alley", this was a colloquial name given to the street extending from the old city to the Qantari hill and which was covered with cobblestones in the 19th century.

Zuqaq al-Blat is also commonly called "al-Batrakieh" (the Patriarchate) due to the presence of the seat of the Greek Catholic Patriarchate of Beirut within its borders.

History
Once a medieval walled port town, Beirut experienced rapid growth during the second half of the 19th century; the overcrowded city developed beyond its walls and the affluent citizens started to build their villas on the slopes of the surrounding hills, namely Ashrafieh, Qnatari and Musaytbeh.

In 1832 Beirut came under the occupation of Ibrahim Pasha's troops. The new Egyptian authorities undertook grand works of urban planning and sanitation. The appointed Egyptian-Circassian governor of Beirut, Mahmoud Naami Bey commissioned street cobbling works which stretched beyond the city's walls, the street extending from the south-western side of the city wall into the new extramural neighborhoods on the Qantari hill came to be known as Zoqaq al-Blat and gave its name to the quarter.

References

Neighbourhoods of Beirut